The 2010-11 version of the Syrian Cup is the 41st edition to be played. It is the premier knockout tournament for  football teams in Syria. Al-Karamah went into this edition as the holders once again.

The competition started on 21 September 2010 but changed from the previous year of games over two legs to a one legged affair.

The cup winner were guaranteed a place in the 2012 AFC Cup.

First qualifying round
Two teams play a knockout tie. One team advance to the next round. Games played over two legs. 

The matches were played on 5–13 October 2010.

|}

Second qualifying round
26 teams play a knockout tie. 18 clubs advance to the next round. Games played over two legs

The matches were played on 21–28 September 2010.

|}
¹The 2nd leg match Mourk vs Al-Yaqdhah was not played and the teams were disqualified.

First round
32 teams play a knockout tie. 16 clubs advance to the next round. Games played over two legs

The matches were played on 27 December – 13 January 2011.

|}
¹Ommal Rmelan failed to the 1st leg match, matches awarded 3-0 to Al-Wahda.

²Al-Hrak failed to the 1st leg match, matches awarded 3-0 to Al-Wathba.

Round of 16
16 teams play a knockout tie. 8 clubs advance to the next round. Games played over two legs

|}

 1 Al-Taliya and Al-Nawair both withdrew from competition. Both Al-Jaish and Omayya were awarded victories.

Quarter-finals
8 teams play a knockout tie. 4 clubs advance to the next round. Games played over two legs

|}

Semi-finals
4 teams play a knockout tie. 2 clubs advance to the Final. Games played over two legs

|}

Final

References

External links
Details on futbol24.com

2010-11
2010–11 domestic association football cups
Cup